Otis Hinkley Stocksdale (Old Gray Fox) (August 7, 1871 – March 15, 1933) was an American professional baseball player who played four seasons for the Washington Senators, Boston Beaneaters and Baltimore Orioles.  
He was born in Arcadia, Maryland, and died in Pennsville, New Jersey at the age of 61.

External links

1871 births
1933 deaths
19th-century baseball players
Washington Senators (1891–1899) players
Boston Beaneaters players
Baltimore Orioles (NL) players
Major League Baseball pitchers
Baseball players from Maryland
Minor league baseball managers
Montgomery Black Sox players
Memphis Egyptians players
Mobile Sea Gulls players
Birmingham Barons players
Lynchburg Shoemakers players
Johns Hopkins Blue Jays baseball players
Duke Blue Devils baseball coaches
North Carolina Tar Heels baseball coaches
Hampton Clamdiggers players